Plamen Khristov (born 5 April 1965) is a Bulgarian volleyball player. He competed at the 1988 Summer Olympics and the 1996 Summer Olympics.

References

1965 births
Living people
Bulgarian men's volleyball players
Olympic volleyball players of Bulgaria
Volleyball players at the 1988 Summer Olympics
Volleyball players at the 1996 Summer Olympics
Sportspeople from Sofia
20th-century Bulgarian people